Adolpho Araújo Netto (born March 2, 1984), known as Araújo, is a Brazilian former footballer who played as a forward and last played for Taboão da Serra.

Career

Career statistics
(Correct )

Contract
 Grêmio Prudente.

References

External links
 soccerway
Adolpho Araújo Netto at ZeroZero

1984 births
Living people
Brazilian footballers
Grêmio Barueri Futebol players
Marília Atlético Clube players
Association football forwards
Footballers from São Paulo